Mon Redee Sut Txi (born 10 February 1982 in Perak) is an athlete from Malaysia. A Malaysian of Thai heritage (Malaysian Siamese) from Pengkalan Hulu in Grik, Perak. She competes in archery.

Sut Txi represented Malaysia at the 2004 Summer Olympics. She placed 32nd in the women's individual ranking round with a 72-arrow score of 626. In the first round of elimination, she faced 33rd-ranked Natalia Bolotova of Russia. Sut Txi lost 154-143 in the 18-arrow match, placing 44th overall in women's individual archery.

References
 sports-reference

1982 births
Living people
People from Perak
Malaysian people of Thai descent
Olympic archers of Malaysia
Archers at the 2004 Summer Olympics
Archers at the 2002 Asian Games
Archers at the 2006 Asian Games
Malaysian female archers
Asian Games competitors for Malaysia